Robert Andrew Peyton (born 1 May 1954) is an English former footballer who played two games in the Football League for Port Vale in 1972.

Career
Peyton played for Chelmsley Town before joining Gordon Lee's Third Division club Port Vale as an amateur in January 1972. He appeared as a substitute in a 3–0 defeat to Rotherham United at Millmoor on 18 April, making his full debut at the return fixture at Vale Park on 8 May. He signed as a professional in July of that year but was not selected again before being given a free transfer in May 1973.

Career statistics
Source:

References

1954 births
Living people
Footballers from Birmingham, West Midlands
English footballers
Association football midfielders
Chelmsley Town F.C. players
Port Vale F.C. players
English Football League players